Gabriel Martín Peñalba (born 23 September 1984) is an Argentine footballer who plays for Argentine club Belgrano as a central midfielder.

Career

The  midfielder started his career with Quilmes in the Primera Division Argentina. After one season with the club he earned himself a transfer to Italian Serie A team Cagliari. However, after just playing three games for Cagliari in the 2006–07 season, he moved back to Argentina for the start of the 2007–08 season to play for Argentinos Juniors.

Honours
Estudiantes
Argentine Primera División (1): 2010 Apertura

Veracruz
Copa MX: Clausura 2016

External links
 
 
 

People from Quilmes
1984 births
Living people
Argentine footballers
Argentine people of Spanish descent
Association football midfielders
Quilmes Atlético Club footballers
Cagliari Calcio players
Argentinos Juniors footballers
Estudiantes de La Plata footballers
FC Lorient players
Club Atlético Tigre footballers
C.D. Veracruz footballers
Cruz Azul footballers
UD Las Palmas players
Club Atlético Belgrano footballers
Argentine Primera División players
Serie A players
Ligue 1 players
La Liga players
Segunda División players
Liga MX players
Primera Nacional players
Argentine expatriate footballers
Expatriate footballers in Italy
Expatriate footballers in France
Expatriate footballers in Mexico
Expatriate footballers in Spain
Argentine expatriate sportspeople in France
Argentine expatriate sportspeople in Italy
Argentine expatriate sportspeople in Mexico
Argentine expatriate sportspeople in Spain
Sportspeople from Buenos Aires Province